Govkra is a rural locality (a selo) in Shovkrinsky Selsoviet, Laksky District, Republic of Dagestan, Russia. The population was 73 as of 2010.

Geography 
Govkra is located 4 km south of Kumukh (the district's administrative centre) by road, on the left bank of the Kazikumukhskoye Koysu River. Shovkra and Khurukra are the nearest rural localities.

Nationalities 
Laks live there.

References 

Rural localities in Laksky District